Rok Kronaveter (born 7 December 1986) is a Slovenian footballer who plays as a midfielder for Slovenian PrvaLiga club NK Maribor.

Club career
Kronaveter began his football career playing for hometown club Železničar Maribor at the age of ten. On 16 March 2003, at the age of 16, he made his senior début for the team during the Slovenian Second League match against Jadran Hrpelje-Kozina, appearing as a second-half substitute. In the summer of 2006, he joined the top division side Drava Ptuj and signed his first professional contract. In January 2010, he signed a one-year contract with Rudar Velenje.

In August 2010, Kronaveter moved abroad for the first time and joined Energie Cottbus, signing a three-year contract. However, his contract was terminated in June 2012, and he signed for Hungarian side Győri ETO soon afterwards. With Győri, he won his first career honour as the team won the 2012–13 national title. He left Győri in September 2014 by mutual consent. After almost six months without a club, he signed for Romanian side Petrolul Ploiești in March 2015.

In June 2015, Kronaveter returned to Slovenia and signed for Olimpija Ljubljana. With Olimpija, he won two league titles (2015–16 and 2017–18); in 2015–16, he was also the league's top goalscorer with 17 goals. In June 2019, Kronaveter signed a two-year contract with Olimpija's arch-rivals Maribor. For Maribor, he scored on his début during the 2019–20 UEFA Champions League first qualifying round match against Valur, converting a late-game penalty kick for a 3–0 victory.

International career
Between 2005 and 2007, Kronaveter played for Slovenian under-20 and under-21 teams, for which he scored one goal in eight appearances.
He made his debut for the senior team on 30 May 2016 in a 0–0 draw against Sweden.

Kronaveter scored his first international goal for Slovenia on 8 October 2016 in a 1–0 victory over Slovakia.

Personal life
Rok Kronaveter was born in Maribor, Slovenia (then part of Yugoslavia), and lived in Malečnik as a toddler, before moving to Maribor at the age of two. His father was a footballer, while his mother was a handball player. His older brother, David, is also a former footballer. Growing up his idol was Brazilian forward Ronaldo.

In 2012, Kronaveter married his long-term partner Sandra. He has two children, a daughter Adriana (born 2011) and a son Lukas (2013).

Career statistics

Club

International

Scores and results list Slovenia's goal tally first, score column indicates score after each Kronaveter goal.

Honours

Club
Győri ETO
Nemzeti Bajnokság I: 2012–13
Szuperkupa: 2013

Olimpija Ljubljana
Slovenian PrvaLiga: 2015–16, 2017–18
Slovenian Cup: 2017–18, 2018–19

Maribor
Slovenian PrvaLiga: 2021–22

Individual
Slovenian PrvaLiga top scorer: 2015–16
Slovenian PrvaLiga Player of the Year: 2015–16
Slovenian PrvaLiga best XI: 2015–16

References

External links

NZS profile 

1986 births
Living people
Sportspeople from Maribor
Slovenian footballers
Slovenia youth international footballers
Slovenia under-21 international footballers
Slovenia international footballers
Association football midfielders
NK Železničar Maribor players
NK Drava Ptuj players
NK Rudar Velenje players
FC Energie Cottbus players
Győri ETO FC players
FC Petrolul Ploiești players
NK Olimpija Ljubljana (2005) players
NK Maribor players
Slovenian Second League players
Slovenian PrvaLiga players
2. Bundesliga players
Regionalliga players
Nemzeti Bajnokság I players
Liga I players
Slovenian expatriate footballers
Slovenian expatriate sportspeople in Germany
Expatriate footballers in Germany
Slovenian expatriate sportspeople in Hungary
Expatriate footballers in Hungary
Slovenian expatriate sportspeople in Romania
Expatriate footballers in Romania